Martha Beatriz Merino Lucero (born November 15, 1947) is a Peruvian lawyer, academic and politician who served as the first female Prime Minister of Peru, in 2003. She previously served as Senator and Congresswoman from 1990 until 2000. Following her tenure in Alejandro Toledo's cabinet, Merino was appointed by the Peruvian Congress as the national ombudswoman for Peru, serving from 2005 to 2011, a position officially known as the Public Defender, being the second to hold the position.

Prominently a female leading persona in Peru, Merino is currently a member of the Council of Women World Leaders, an international network of current and former women presidents and prime ministers whose mission is to mobilize the highest-level women leaders globally, for collective action on issues of critical importance to women and equitable development.

Early life and education
Martha Beatriz Merino Lucero was born on November 15, 1947, in Lima, Peru. Her father, Augusto Merino Abrego (1915-2015), was a decorated public servant, serving as Treasurer and Finance Director of the San Isidro municipality. Throughout her career and in various interviews offered to the media, Merino highlighted the influence of her father on her professional development. Her mother was Aída Lucero (1916-2013).

After finishing high school at the Parochial School of Santa Rosa of Lince, Merino enrolled in the National University of San Marcos. Graduating a with law degree in 1970, she was awarded a scholarship in order to attend the London School of Economics graduate program, where she would attain a Master of Laws (LL.M.) in tax law in 1972. Relocating to the United States, she pursued a second Master of Laws at Harvard University with a Fulbright scholarship, becoming the first Peruvian woman to graduate from Harvard Law School, in 1977.

Career
Following her graduation from Harvard, Merino pursued a career at Procter & Gamble, serving as Legal, Commercial, International, Environment and Corporate Manager. She held the positions in Lima, Caracas (Latin America headquarters) and Cincinnati (world headquarters). She was also the director of Procter & Gamble for Peru, Ecuador, Chile, Bolivia and Colombia, from January 1979 to November 1989, and from July 1992 to December 1994.

In 1989, Mario Vargas Llosa invited her to run for the Peruvian Senate in the 1990 general election. Running as part of the Democratic Front (FREDEMO) coalition, she was ultimately elected along twenty other candidates from the Christian People's Party and Popular Action (Peru), being herself a member of the Liberty Movement.

During her time as a Senator, she presided over the Environment, Ecology and Amazon Committee and the Women's Rights Committee. Her tenure would be cut-short on April 5, 1992, as president Alberto Fujimori dissolved congress with a self-coup. She would return to the newly inaugurated unicameral Congress in 1995, running as an independent within the Independent Moralizing Front, led by Fernando Olivera. She would serve as a staunch opposition member in Congress, leading numerous bills against the Fujimori regime.

In 1993, Merino founded the Merino & Reaño Law Firm, where she worked extensively in commercial, labor, corporate and environmental legislation. She was senior partner from 1993 to 2001.

Approaching the 2000 general election, mayor Alberto Andrade of Lima invited Merino as his second running mate for the We Are Peru nomination, alongside Luis Guerrero as first running mate. Despite favorable polling numbers at the start of the race, the government's machinations led by National Intelligence Service ran a smear campaign against Andrade, ultimately destroying his chances in the general election.

Following Fujimori's downfall in late 2000, Merino was appointed Superintendent of the Peruvian Internal Revenue Service, serving from 2001 to 2003. During her two-year tenure, she directed the master's degree program in taxation and fiscal policy at the University of Lima.

Prime Minister of Peru (2003)
Merino became the President of the Council of Ministers on June 23, 2003, the highest political rank ever held by a woman in the history of Peru, appointed by president Alejandro Toledo. During her brief premiership, she led a successful tax reform bill, and laid over a modernizing restructuring process of the Peruvian government.

On July 18, 2003, she appeared before Congress in order present the general policy of the government and request the confidence vote. Merino referred to the government's economic policy and promotion of economic development and employment. Merino received confirmation of Congress with 61 votes in favor, 1 against and 17 abstentions.

Her management was characterized by lifting the Toledo regime's approval ratings; however, she resigned on December 15, 2003, at the request of Toledo, citing differences in policy management.

In early December 2003, a television program questioned Merino about an alleged influence peddling to favor friends and family during her time as Superintendent at the Peruvian Internal Revenue Service (SUNAT). Given this, in an appearance before the local press denied that she had influenced the hiring for her friends. After that, Merino traveled to the United States for academic conferences.

On December 13, president Toledo asked for the resignation of all his ministers and the 7 presidential advisers.

Upon her return to Lima, Merino explained to the press that she had resigned from the office of Prime Minister on the first day of December and that President Toledo asked her to stay a while longer until he found a successor. She also commented that she was summoned in October by a senior dignitary of the Catholic Church, who informed her that a political leader made accusations against her and questioned her moral integrity. She was succeeded in the premiership by Carlos Ferrero, a prominent member of Possible Peru and three-year president of Congress.

Public Defender (2005-2011)
After stepping down as Prime Minister, Merino held high approval ratings as a public persona. While On September 29, 2005, Congress elected her as the second Public Defender of Peru, succeeding the acting holder, Walter Albán. Congress had been unable to appoint a new holder since the expiration of Jorge Santistevan de Noriega's term in 2000. She was nominated by the National Unity parliamentary bench. Until her election as Defender, she served at the World Bank as Senior Specialist in the Public Sector area, in charge of issues related to Tax Administration and Policy, Modernization of the State and Strengthening of Congresses for Latin America.

During her term as Public Defender, she successfully called for the release of peasants from Chaca (Ayacucho) unfairly accused of terrorism, raised the inquiry on the creation of the Ministry of the Environment (2008), recommended the reform of the Pension Standardization Office (2008-2009), took over the Vilma Palma Case achieving a first sentence for discrimination in Peru (2009), and contributed in the Prior Consultation Law (2009). Overall, she has been cited for contributing to the restoration of peace and the restitution of the affected rights of the most vulnerable sectors of the Peruvian population.

Later career (2011-2015)

Her term in the Office of the Public Defender expired in 2010, but she remained in office until she tendered her resignation on March 30, 2011, being succeeded by Eduardo Luna Vega, who served as acting defender until the election of Walter Gutiérrez Camacho en 2016. Following her resignation, she was appointed Chairwoman of the Public Pension's Administrators Association. She stepped down on January 16, 2012. During her time in office, she contributed to the expansion of knowledge of the private pension's system throughout the country, taking over the initiative of improving the benefits of affiliated members.

In November 2011, she was appointed director of the Center for Social Responsibility, Entrepreneurship and Sustainability of CENTRUM, renowned business school of the Pontifical Catholic University of Peru. She stepped down from the academic post in November 2015. Conjointly, she served as Chairwoman of the National Hydrocarbons Society, from January 2013 to December 2015.

César Vallejo University controversies (2016 - present) 
Academically, she currently serves as Executive President of the César Vallejo University since February 8, 2016, appointed by then-presidential questionable nominee César Acuña Peralta, who has committed plagiarism in his Ph.D. thesis dissertation and has been involver in several cases of money laundering. Following these allegations, Francisco Miró Quesada Rada resigned as  Executive President, due in particular to the plagiarism allegations against Acuña in the middle of the presidential campaign. Under her leading the questionable private university which has used questionable criteria for analysing previous theses systematically by more than 1,700 researchers from the nine postgraduate programmes in Education. These irregularities sum to the public accusations of plagiarism made against the President Pedro Castillo and the first lady, Lilia Paredes, both students of the same university. Recently, Gavin Jones scientist of the United States Forest Service Rocky Mountain Research Station denounced that two undergraduate thesis students also plagiarised an academic article Surprisingly, however, Merino is part of the Advanced Leadership Initiative at Harvard University.

Awards and recognitions
 Doctor Honoris Causa - Federico Villarreal National University (2003)
 Doctor Honoris Causa - Private University of Chiclayo (2003)
 Order of the Southern Cross in the Degree of Grand Cross - Federative Republic of Brazil (2003)
 Order of Merit in the Degree of Grand Cross - National Police of Peru (2003)
 "María Elena Moyano" Award - Ministry of Women and Social Development (2003)
 "Robert G. Storey" Leadership Award - Center for American and International Law (2004)
 Order of the Sun of Peru in the Degree of the Grand Cross (2006)
 Doctor Honoris Causa from the National University of Saint Augustine (2007)
 Flora Tristán Medal - National University of San Marcos (2009)
 Order of the Merit of Women - Ministry of Women and Social Development (2010)
 Citizen Merit Medal - Presidency of the Council of Ministers of Peru (2010)
 Medal "Francisco García Calderón" - Lima Bar Association (2010)
 Lifetime Achievement Award - Harvard University (2015)
 Doctor Honoris Causa - Universidad César Vallejo (2015)
 Trailblazer Award - Women Political Leaders (2019)

References

 Wildman, Sarah. "Prime Minister's Peril." Advocate 907 (2004): 15. Academic Search Premier. EBSCOhost. Hugh Stephens Library, Columbia. 5 Apr. 2008. Keyword: Beatriz Merino.
 "Initial Signataries to the Global Action Plan." Win with Women Global Initiative. NDI Women's Programs. 5 Apr. 2008 >.
 Skard, Torild (2014) "Beatriz Merino" in Women of power - half a century of female presidents and prime ministers worldwide, Bristol: Policy Press,

External links

1947 births
Living people
Alumni of the London School of Economics
Harvard Law School alumni
Members of the Senate of Peru
Members of the Congress of the Republic of Peru
Ombudsmen
National University of San Marcos alumni
Peruvian democracy activists
Peruvian women activists
Women government ministers of Peru
Possible Peru politicians
Prime Ministers of Peru
Women prime ministers
Public defenders
Women members of the Congress of the Republic of Peru
César Vallejo University
20th-century Peruvian politicians
20th-century Peruvian women politicians
21st-century Peruvian politicians
21st-century Peruvian women politicians